The year 1954 in science and technology involved some significant events, listed below.

Astronomy
 November 30 – In Sylacauga, Alabama, an 8.5 pound sulfide meteorite crashes through a roof and hits Mrs. Elizabeth Hodges in her living room after bouncing off her radio, giving her a bad bruise; the first known modern case of a human being hit by a space rock.

Biology
 January 10 – Last confirmed specimen of a Caspian tiger is killed, in the valley of the Sumbar River in the Kopet Dag Mountains of Turkmenistan.
 Daniel I. Arnon demonstrates in the laboratory the chemical function of photosynthesis in chloroplasts.
 Heinz Sielmann makes the pioneering nature documentary about woodpeckers, Zimmerleute des Waldes ("Carpenters of the forest").
 Eduard Paul Tratz and Heinz Heck propose the species name bonobo for what was previously known as the pygmy chimpanzee.

Chemistry
 Publication of the first analysis of the three-dimensional molecular structure of vitamin B12 by a group including Dorothy Hodgkin, and utilising computer analysis provided by Kenneth Nyitray Trueblood.
 The Wittig reaction is discovered by German chemist Georg Wittig.

Computer science
 January – The TRADIC Phase One computer is completed at Bell Labs in the United States, a candidate to be regarded as the first transistor computer.
 January 7 – Georgetown-IBM experiment: the first public demonstration of a machine translation system held in New York at the head office of IBM.

Geology
 December 31 – The first specimens of the mineral benstonite are collected by Orlando J. Benston in the Magnet Cove igneous complex of Arkansas.

History of science
 Joseph Needham begins publication of Science and Civilisation in China (Cambridge University Press).
 A History of Technology, edited by Charles Singer, E. J. Holmyard and A. R. Hall, begins publication (Oxford University Press).

Mathematics
 January 6 – The Luhn algorithm, devised by IBM information scientist Hans Peter Luhn, is described in a United States patent.
 Klaus Roth publishes a paper laying the foundations for modern discrepancy theory.
 Leonard Jimmie Savage publishes Foundations of Statistics, promoting Bayesian statistics.

Medicine
 February 23 – The first mass vaccination of children against polio begins, in Pittsburgh, Pennsylvania.
 August 10 – British epidemiologist Richard Doll submits a study on the risk to workers in asbestos manufacture of mortality from lung cancer.
 The first organ transplants are done in Boston and Paris.
 December 23 – Joseph Murray at Peter Bent Brigham Hospital in Boston carries out the first successful kidney transplant, between identical twins.
 The first of the anti-psychotic phenothiazine drugs, Chlorpromazine, starts being sold under the trade names Thorazine (U.S.) and Largactil (U.K.)
 The sucrose gap is introduced by Robert Stämpfli for the reliable measurement of action potential in nerve fibers.

Metrology
 10th General Conference on Weights and Measures proposes the six original SI base units.
 Alexander Macmillan publishes the "Macmillan correction" to account for errors in the calculation of velocity of an object moving along a gradient due to viscous effects and wall proximity.

Physics
 January 2 – Harold Hopkins and Narinder Singh Kapany at Imperial College London report achieving low-loss light transmission through a 75 cm long optical fiber bundle.
 March 1 – United States carries out a hydrogen bomb test on Bikini Atoll in the Pacific Ocean.
 September 29 – CERN is founded by twelve European states.

Psychology
Summer – Robbers Cave Experiment carried out by Muzafer and Carolyn Sherif.
Man Meets Dog is published by Konrad Lorenz.

Technology
 June 26 – Obninsk Nuclear Power Plant, the first civilian nuclear power station, is commissioned in the Soviet Union.
 June 29 – Buckminster Fuller is granted a United States patent for his development of the geodesic dome.
 September 30 – The submarine , the first atomic-powered vessel, is commissioned by the United States Navy.
 October 18 – Texas Instruments announces development of the first commercial transistor radio, the Regency TR-1, manufactured in Indianapolis; it goes on sale the following month.
 December 16 – The first synthetic diamond is produced.
 New Zealand engineer Sir William Hamilton develops the first pump-jet engine (the "Hamilton Jet") capable of propelling a jetboat.
 The first electric drip brew coffeemaker is patented in Germany and named the Wigomat after its inventor Gottlob Widmann.
 Staley T. McBrayer invents the Vanguard web offset press for newspaper printing in Fort Worth, Texas.
 The Angle grinder is invented by German company Ackermann + Schmitt (Flex-Elektrowerkzeuge).

Awards
 Fields Prize in Mathematics: Kunihiko Kodaira and Jean-Pierre Serre, the latter being the youngest-ever winner, at age 27
 Nobel Prizes
 Physics – Max Born and Walther Bothe
 Chemistry – Linus Pauling
 Medicine – John Franklin Enders, Thomas Huckle Weller and Frederick Chapman Robbins

Births
 January 16 – Morten P. Meldal, Danish Nobel Chemistry laureate, 2022.
 February 9 – Kevin Warwick, English scientist, author of March of the Machines.
 March – Clare Marx, English surgeon.
 May 14 – Peter J. Ratcliffe, English cellular biologist, Nobel Medicine laureate, 2019.
 June 20 – Ilan Ramon (died 2003), Israeli astronaut.
 July 11 – Julia King, English materials engineer.
 July 17 – Angela Kasner, German physical chemist and Chancellor.
 August 28 – George M. Church, American geneticist, molecular engineer and chemist.
 September 5 – Myeong-Hee Yu, South Korean microbiologist.
 November 1 – Graham Colditz, Australian-born epidemiologist.
 November 7 – Vijay Kumar, Indian molecular biologist.
 Pat Hanrahan, American computer scientist.
 George McGavin, Scottish entomologist.
 Huda Zoghbi, Lebanese-born geneticist.

Deaths
 January 17 – Leonard Eugene Dickson (born 1874), American mathematician.
 March 7
 Otto Diels (born 1876), German Nobel Chemistry laureate, 1950.
 Ludwik Hirszfeld (born 1884), Polish microbiologist and serologist.
 April 10 – Auguste Lumière (born 1862), French inventor, film pioneer.
 April 21 – Emil Post (born 1897), American mathematician and logician.
 June 7 – Alan Turing (born 1912), English mathematician and computer scientist (probable suicide).
 July 11 – Henry Valentine Knaggs (born 1859), English practitioner of naturopathic medicine.
 October 3 – Vera Fedorovna Gaze (born 1899), Soviet Russian astronomer.
 October 8 – Dimitrie Pompeiu (born 1873), Romanian mathematician.
 November 29 – Enrico Fermi (born 1901), Italian American physicist.

References

 
20th century in science
1950s in science